is a Japanese competitor in synchronized swimming.

She won a bronze medal at the 2015 World Aquatics Championships. She also won 1 gold, 2 silvers and 1 bronze at the 2014 FINA World Junior Synchronised Swimming Championships.

References

Living people
Japanese synchronized swimmers
1997 births
World Aquatics Championships medalists in synchronised swimming
Sportspeople from Osaka
Synchronized swimmers at the 2015 World Aquatics Championships
Synchronized swimmers at the 2017 World Aquatics Championships
21st-century Japanese women